

Franz Pöschl (2 November 1917 – 25 January 2011) was an officer in the Wehrmacht of Nazi Germany during World War II and a general in the Bundeswehr of West Germany.  He was also a recipient of the Knight's Cross of the Iron Cross.

Awards and decorations
 Iron Cross (1939)
 2nd Class 
 1st Class 
 German Cross in Gold (30 July 1942)
 Knight's Cross of the Iron Cross on 23 February 1944 as Hauptmann and commander of I./Gebirgsjäger-Regiment 100
 Commander Cross of the Order of Merit of the Federal Republic of Germany 1973
 Knight Commander of the Order of Merit of the Federal Republic of Germany 1977

References

Citations

Bibliography

 

1917 births
2011 deaths
Bundeswehr generals
Gebirgsjäger of World War II
Recipients of the Gold German Cross
Recipients of the Knight's Cross of the Iron Cross
Knights Commander of the Order of Merit of the Federal Republic of Germany
Military personnel from Munich
People from the Kingdom of Bavaria
Lieutenant generals of the German Army